Benny Lim (born 1980, in Singapore) was the artistic director of the now defunct the Fun Stage, a non-profit theatre group in Singapore. He obtained a Doctor of Philosophy from the Division of Drama, University of Glamorgan (now known as the University of South Wales) in 2012.

Biography
In 2001, at the age of 21, he founded the Fun Stage and has since held on to the record as the youngest artistic director of a theatre company in Singapore. In 2006, one of Benny's plays, Existence, was published in Singapore. Existence was written in 2003, inspired by the poetry of Cyril Wong, as a response to Leslie Cheung's suicide. The play was mentioned in Time magazine (10 August 2003) as a story that "portrays the love of two young Singaporean men for each other as doomed". In 2015, Benny co-curated Umbrella Festival, an arts festival in Hong Kong, in response to city's Umbrella Movement.

Censorship
Benny's works often deal with social-political issues within a postmodern society. In 2004, Benny organized the Lovers' Lecture Series, which was not given a go-ahead by the Public Entertainment Licensing Unit (PELU) under the Singapore Police Force. In 2005, Benny collaborated with artist Brian Gothong Tan on a devised play, Human Lefts. The content of the play, which was on the issue of the death penalty, was given a total ban by the Media Development Authority of Singapore (MDA).

References

Singaporean people of Chinese descent
1980 births
People from Singapore
Living people